Elmer F. Bennett (September 17, 1917 – July 10, 1989) was an attorney who held various positions in the United States Department of the Interior during Dwight D. Eisenhower's administration. Bennett specialized in the legal problems of the use of natural resources.

In later years Bennett worked for the Public Land Law Review Commission and then for the Office of Emergency Preparedness. In the latter office he dealt with the problem of oil imports and oil price increases in the early 1970s.

Bennett died of congestive heart failure on July 10, 1989, in Roslyn, New York, where he had been living since 1983.

References

1917 births
1989 deaths
20th-century American lawyers
United States Department of the Interior
People from Longmont, Colorado
People from Roslyn, New York